The 2018–19 season was Futbol Club Barcelona's 119th season in existence and the club's 88th consecutive season in the top flight of Spanish football. Barcelona was involved in four competitions after winning the double of La Liga and the Copa del Rey in the previous season.

Contrary to the expectations and primarily due to stellar Lionel Messi performances, Barcelona was en route to its third continental treble until May 7 when it infamously lost to Liverpool 0–4 in the second leg of the Champions League semi-finals, having been up 3–0 after the first game. The league title was secured earlier on April 27 and Barça advanced to its sixth consecutive Copa del Rey final on February 27. The loss at Anfield derailed the team and they went on to lose the Copa final as well. Barça's league title was its eighth in eleven seasons; they have since won none, only securing the 2020–21 Copa del Rey in the three years since. Head coach Ernesto Valverde was sacked midway next season.

The season was the first since 2001–02 season without former captain Andrés Iniesta, who departed to join Vissel Kobe.

Season overview

June
On 3 June, Barcelona and defender Samuel Umtiti reached an agreement to extend the player's contract for a further five seasons through to 2022–23 with a release clause of €500 million.

On 11 June, Barcelona reached an agreement with Watford for the transfer of Gerard Deulofeu for €13 million plus €4 million in variables. Barcelona will also receive a percentage of any future transfer fee.

July
On 8 July, Barcelona announced that they had reached an agreement with Guangzhou Evergrande for the loan transfer of Paulinho for one season, with a subsequent purchase option for the Chinese club.

On 9 July, Barcelona and Grêmio finalized the transfer of Arthur following the agreement the two clubs reached in March for a transfer fee of €31 million plus €9 million in variables. The player will sign a contract for the next six seasons and the buyout clause is set at €400 million.

On 12 July, Barcelona announced that they had paid the buyout clause for Clément Lenglet which stood at €35.9 million. The player, who joined from Sevilla, signed a contract with the club for the next five seasons and the buyout clause is set at  €300 million.

On 23 July, Barcelona announced that they had reached an agreement with Sivasspor for the loan transfer of Douglas for one season.

On 23 July, Barcelona announced that they had reached an agreement with Deportivo La Coruña for the loan transfer of Adrián Ortolá for one season, with a subsequent purchase option for the A Coruña club.

On 24 July, Barcelona announced that they had reached an agreement with Bordeaux for the transfer of Malcom for a transfer fee of €41 million plus €1 million in variables. The player signed a contract for the next five seasons until the end of 2022–23.

August

On 1 August, Barcelona and Everton reached an agreement for the transfer of Lucas Digne to the English club for an initial fee of €20.2 million and €1.5 million in variables.

On 3 August, Barcelona announced that they had reached an agreement with Bayern Munich for the transfer of Arturo Vidal to the Catalan club for the next three seasons for a fee of €18 million.

On 4 August, Barcelona and Sevilla reached an agreement for the transfer of Aleix Vidal to the Andalusian club for a transfer fee of €8.5 million, plus €2 million in variables.

On 9 August, Barcelona and Everton reached an agreement for the transfer of Yerry Mina for a fee of €30.25 million with an additional €1.5 million in variables. Barcelona also negotiated a buy-back clause in the transfer. Additionally, André Gomes was loaned to Everton for the 2018–19 season. The English club agreed to pay a fee of €2.25 million for the single season.

On 12 August, Barcelona defeated Sevilla 1–2 in the Spanish Super Cup at the Stade Ibn Batouta in Morocco; goals from Gerard Piqué and Ousmane Dembélé handed the Catalans their 13th Supercopa de España title. The  trophy was the first won under the captaincy of Lionel Messi, who also claimed his record-breaking 33rd trophy with the club. Additionally, the match saw official debuts from Arthur, Lenglet, and Arturo Vidal.

On 16 August, Barcelona announced that they had reached an agreement for the transfer of Marlon to the Italian club Sassuolo for an initial fee of €6 million, including a buy-back clause for the Catalans. Barcelona will receive additional €6 million if Marlon makes 50 appearances for Sassuolo. If he would be sold before that, Barcelona will receive 50% of the future transfer fee.

On 18 August, Barcelona defeated Alavés 3–0 with two goals from Messi, including the 6,000th La Liga goal in the club's history, and one from Coutinho to secure Barça an opening day victory for a tenth successive season.

On 25 August, Barcelona defeated Real Valladolid 0–1, Barça made it two wins out of two thanks to a goal from Dembélé. The match also saw an official debut from Malcom.

September
On 2 September, Barcelona demolished newly promoted Huesca 8–2. A sensational Messi who scored 2 goals had the chance to get his hat-trick with a final minute penalty, but chose to be generous and gave the chance to Suárez who scored his 2nd goal of the game. Dembélé, Ivan Rakitić, Jordi Alba were also on the scoresheet, along with an own goal from Jorge Pulido.

On 15 September, Barcelona defeated Real Sociedad 1–2. Despite trailing at half time, goals from Suárez and Dembélé turned things around to make it four wins out of four in La Liga.

On 18 September, Barcelona beat PSV Eindhoven 4–0 in their first Champions League game of the season. Another great performance of Messi as he managed his record-breaking 8th Champions League hat-trick and Dembélé notched the remaining goal from a solo effort to complete another victory for the Blaugrana side.

On 23 September, Barcelona draw Girona 2–2. Sending off for Lenglet hinders home side, Messi and Piqué found the net for the Blaugrana.

On 26 September, Barcelona lost to Leganés 2–1. Coutinho's opener counts for nothing as top against bottom clash took unexpected twist with two goals in a minute.

On 29 September, Barcelona draw Athletic Bilbao 1–1. Substitutes Messi and Munir came to the rescue to salvage a draw at Camp Nou after Basques had taken 41st-minute lead

October
On 3 October, Barcelona defeated Tottenham 2–4, with some major changes in the starting eleven introducing Arthur as a starter for the first time in midfield, the benching of Dembele and putting Coutinho back in attack with Messi and Suarez. Valverde's men secured an important victory in a classic, end-to-end match in London to maintain their perfect start in the Champions League group stage.

On 7 October, Barcelona drew with Valencia CF 1-1. Messi scored a beautiful equaliser after an early opener from Garay to earn the blaugranes a share of the spoils at Mestalla.

On 20 October, Barcelona defeated Sevilla 4-2. Four goals and a sensational performance by Ter Stegen allowed Barça to snatch first place back from the leaders on a night that Leo Messi went off injured.

On 24 October, Barcelona defeated Inter Milan 2-0. Rafinha and Jordi Alba's superb goals left the Catalans flying high in Champions League Group B with the maximum points at the halfway stage.

On 28 October, in the first El Clásico of the season, and the first since 2007 not to feature Messi or Cristiano Ronaldo, Barcelona thrashed Real Madrid 5–1 at the Camp Nou, with Luis Suárez scoring a hat-trick.

November
On 3 November, Barca defeated Rayo Vallecano 2-3, two goals from Suárez and another from Ousmane Dembélé earned the Blaugranes a late win at Vallecas.

On 6 November, Barca draw Inter Milan 1-1, Malcom's  1st goal was not enough at the Giuseppe Meazza after the equalizing  goal of Icardi, but Barça still made the knockout stages with two games in hand.

On 11 November, Barca lost 3-4 to Betis, The Andalusians spoiled Messi's return to action who scored 2 goals, with a shock victory in a dramatic encounter at the Camp Nou seeing Rakitic being sent off after picking his 2nd yellow card .

On 24 November, Barca draw Atlético Madrid 1-1, Diego Costa's late header at the Wanda Metropolitano was cancelled out by Ousmane Dembélé after a brilliant pass of Messi in the final minute of normal time.in addition both Sergi Roberto and rafinha got injured after the game against Atlético   

On 28 November, Barca defeated PSV Eindhoven 1-2, Goals from a sensational Messi and Piqué clinched the points that ensure top spot in Champions League Group B with a game in hand.

December
On 2 December, Barcelona defeated Villarreal 2-0 with goals from Gerard Piqué and Carles Aleñá, as well as a great all-round team performance which ensured the win and a clean sheet against worthy opponents.

On 8 December, Barcelona defeated Espanyol 0-4 with two sensational free kicks from Leo Messi, plus goals from Dembélé and Luis Suárez which brought derby delight and another week at the top of the table.

On 11 December, Barcelona drew 1-1 with Tottenham producing a magnificent performance as Dembélé scored Barça's only goal.

On 16 December, Barcelona defeated Levante 0-5 playing sensational football which saw them power their way to victory in Valencia. Leo Messi scored yet another hat-trick with Luis Suárez and Gerard Piqué scoring the other goals.

On 20 December, Barcelona announced that they had reached an agreement with Valencia for the transfer of Jeison Murillo on loan for the remainder of the 2018/19 season. The agreement includes a purchase option worth €25m.

On 22 December, Barcelona defeated Celta Vigo 2-0 with goals from Leo Messi and Ousmane Dembele. The win ensured Barca remained on top of the table, three points ahead of Atletico Madrid, heading into the winter break.

January
On 6 January, Barcelona defeated Getafe 1-2, goals from a sensational Leo Messi and a volley from Luis Suárez overcame a tough opponent and put the Barcelona five points clear at the top of the Liga table.

On 10 January, Barcelona lost to Levante 2-1 in Copa del Rey round of 16, Philippe Coutinho converted a penalty five minutes from the end.

On 13 January, Barcelona defeated Eibar 3-0, by 2 goals of Luis Suarez who was on fire with the first goal coming from a brilliant combination with a reborn Philipe Coutinho, the other goal being scored by none other than a sensational Leo Messi, which made it his record 400th La Liga goal.

On 17 January, Barcelona defeated Levante 3-0 in Copa del Rey round of 16 return game, by 2 goals of Ousmane Dembele and a goal of Leo Messi, this win made sure Barcelona qualified for the Copa del Rey quarter finals.

On 20 January, Barcelona defeated Leganés 3-1, as the first-place Catalans chew up the 'Cucumber Growers' at Camp Nou.

On 23 January, Barcelona lost to Sevilla 2-0 in the Copa del Rey quarterfinals. Juan Sarabia and Ben Yedder scored the goals for Sevilla.

On 23 January, Barcelona announced that they had reached an agreement with Ajax for the transfer of Frankie De Jong who will be joining the Catalan club from 1 July 2019. The transfer fee is 75 million euros, plus a further 11 million in variables. The player will be signing a contract for the next five seasons, through to 2023/24.

On 27 January, Barcelona won Girona 0-2. Nelson Semedo's first League goal and another Leo Messi special handed Barça all three points.

On 30 January, Barcelona won Sevilla 6-1 in the Copa del Rey quarterfinals 2nd leg. Phil Coutinho nets a brace, while Ivan Rakitic, Sergi Roberto, Luis Suárez and Leo Messi notch a goal each. the victory made sure Barcelona qualified for the semifinals of the Copa del Rey

February

On 1 February, the announcement was made that Barcelona would face Real Madrid in the semifinals of the Copa del Rey,
in the second El Clásico of this season.

On 2 February, Barça draw Valencia 2-2, Leo Messi scored twice as first-place Barça battle back from 2-0, first-half deficit to earn a tie and provisionally extend their lead at the top of the table.

On 6 February, Barça draw Real Madrid 1-1, The Catalans and the Madrileños finished all square at Camp Nou in the first leg of the Copa del Rey semifinals; Malcom pulled Barça even after Lucas Vásquez put Los Blancos up early. Making the second leg game at the Bernabeu even more exciting 

On 10 February, Barça draw Athletic 0-0, Barça had the possession but without doing too much with it.

On 16 February, Barça won Valladolid 1-0, Barça picked up three vital points in La Liga thanks to a Leo Messi first half penalty. Messi could have doubled the lead with a second penalty given near the end, but the keeper stopped the penalty 

On 19 February, Barça draw Lyon 0-0, Barça had 25 shots on goal but no joy with the tie.

On 23 February, Barça won Sevilla 2-4, Lionel Messi's stunning hat-trick against his favourite opponent, and Luis Suarez's late goal secured the points for the Blaugrana who twice went behind.

On 27 February, Barça won Real Madrid 0-3 (1-4 agg), Luis Suárez was the hero as his two goals plus an own goal send a rampant Barça flying into yet another cup final, the 6th Copa Del Rey final in a row for Barca and they are looking to make it their 5th straight victory in a row

March
On 2 March, Barça won Real Madrid 0-1, Ivan Rakitic goal secured second win of the week at the Bernabéu. It was four seasons in a row now that Barça have won at Real Madrid in the league, a feat that no other team has ever achieved. FC Barcelona have claimed their 96th win the fixture overtaking Real Madrid for the first time in 87 years.

On 4 March, Barça and Sergi Samper agreed to a contract termination.

On 9 March, Barça won Rayo Vallecano 3-1. Raúl de Tomás scored for the visitors in the 25th minute with an outside of the box shot, Gerard Piqué equalised with a header in the 39th minute, Lionel Messi put Barcelona in the lead with a 51st-minute penalty and Luis Suárez finished off the game with an 82nd minute tap-in.

On 13 March, Barça won Lyon 5-1 (5-1 agg), a magnificent performance from Lionel Messi saw the Argentine grab two of Barça's five goals, and assist in two more for Gerard Piqué and Ousmane Dembélé, Philippe Coutinho completing the scoring. FC Barcelona hold the record in the Champions League for 12 consecutive appearances in the last eight of Europe's top club competition.

On 15 March, it was announced that Barça would face Manchester United in the quarter-finals of the UEFA Champions League.

On 17 March, Barça won Real Betis 1-4. Leo Messi posted yet another legendary hat-trick performance, Luis Suárez added the other, and Barça fly into a ten-point lead in La Liga. Unfortunately the Uruguayan sustained an injury keeping him out of play for 10–15 days.

On the 30th, Barcelona got back to winning ways after the international break, with a 2-0 victory over Espanyol in Derbi barceloní with both goals from Messi.

April
A thriller of an encounter against Villarreal on 2 April found Barça grab a point in a 4-4 draw after two late goals from Messi and Suárez.

On 6 April, Barça won against Atlético de Madrid at the Camp Nou 2-0, goals scored by Luis Suarez and Lionel Messi, a thriller of a match that saw Spanish centre forward Diego Costa being sent off the field after receiving a red card. With that win, Messi became the player with the most wins in La Liga with 335.

On 10 April, Barça won Manchester United 0-1, that was the first victory at Old Trafford via a Luke Shaw own goal.

On 13 April, Barça drew with Huesca 0-0, a much-changed Barcelona gave first team debuts to Jean-Clair Todibo and Moussa Wague.

On 16 April, Barça won Manchester United 3-0 (4-0 agg). An
incredible performance by Messi who scored two first-half goals with Coutinho adding a second-half rocket to qualify Barça for their eighth Champions League semi-final in the last 12 seasons.

On 20 April, Barça won against Real Sociedad 2-1, Lenglet's towering first-half header and Alba's second were enough for Barça to take all three points.

On 23 April, Barça won against Alavés 0-2, Aleñá's opener and Suárez's spot-kick were enough to earn all three points against Alavés.

On 27 April, Barça won against Levante 1-0, Substitute Messi fired in the only goal of the game to secure a 26th Liga title with three games in hand, which made it Barça's 8th La Liga title in 11 years.

May
On 1 May, Barça won 3–0 against Liverpool in the first leg of the Champions League semi-final. Suarez scored the first goal, followed by two goals by Messi, the third a superb freekick from over 30 yards, providing them with a clear advantage going into the away leg on 7 May at Anfield. Messi's second goal saw him reach 600 goals for Barça in 683 matches. On 4 May, Barça lost 2–0 to Celta Vigo in La Liga, with much of the team rested for the second game with Liverpool.

On 7 May, Barça lost 4–0 against Liverpool via goals from Divock Origi (2) and Georginio Wijnaldum (2), crashing out of the Champions League.

On 19 May, in Barcelona's final La Liga match of the season, Messi scored twice in a 2–2 away draw against Eibar (his 49th and 50th goals of the season in all competitions), which saw him capture his sixth Pichichi Trophy as the league's top scorer, with 36 goals in 34 appearances; with six titles, he equalled Zarra as the player with the most top-scorer awards in La Liga.

On 25 May, Barça lost the Copa Del Rey final to Valencia 1–2. Lionel Messi scored the only Barcelona goal that night. This loss marked the end of the season for FC Barcelona who won two trophies (La liga and Supercopa de España) out of the possible four, despite having been close to winning them all up until 7 May.

Kit

Squad information

First team squad

From youth squad

Source:Champions League 2018/19 numbers

Transfers and loans

Transfers in

Transfers out

Loans in

Loans out

Transfer summary
Undisclosed fees are not included in the transfer totals.

Expenditure

Summer:  €107,900,000

Winter:  €4,000,000

Total:  €111,900,000

Income

Summer:  €82,200,000

Winter:  €24,050,000

Total:  €106,250,000

Net totals

Summer:  €25,700,000

Winter:  €20,050,000

Total:  €5,650,000

Pre-season and friendlies

International Champions Cup

Barcelona began their 2018–19 pre-season with a tour of the United States in the 2018 International Champions Cup. Barça played against Tottenham Hotspur at the Rose Bowl in Pasadena, Roma at the AT&T Stadium in Arlington and Milan at the Levi's Stadium in Santa Clara.

Joan Gamper Trophy

The Blaugrana finished their pre-season preparations with the annual Joan Gamper Trophy match against Boca Juniors of Argentina at the Camp Nou on 15 August.

Supercopa de Catalunya

Competitions

Overview

La Liga

Barcelona were the defending champions. On 24 July 2018, the La Liga fixtures for the forthcoming season were announced.

Standings

Results summary

Results by round

Matches

Copa del Rey

Barcelona entered the competition as the four-time defending champions, having won consecutive editions in 2014–15, 2015–16, 2016–17 and 2017–18.

Round of 32

Round of 16

Quarter-finals

Semi-finals

Final

Supercopa de España

As the winners of the 2017–18 Copa del Rey and 2017–18 La Liga, Barcelona faced the Copa del Rey runners-up, Sevilla, for the season opening Supercopa de España. For the first time in the tournament history, it was a single match hosted in a neutral venue at the Stade Ibn Batouta in Tangier, Morocco.

UEFA Champions League

On 30 August, Barcelona were drawn in Group B of the UEFA Champions League alongside Tottenham Hotspur from Premier League, PSV Eindhoven from Eredivise and Internazionale from Serie A. After topping Group B, Barcelona advanced to knockout phase as a seeded team, and were drawn against Lyon from Ligue 1 in the round of 16. In the draw for the quarter-finals, Barcelona were drawn against Premier League side Manchester United, and in the draw for the semi-finals, against the winner of the tie between Liverpool and Porto, if Barcelona advance to a further round. Originally, the quarter-finals match was scheduled to be played with the first leg at Camp Nou and the second leg at Old Trafford, but the order of the two legs was reversed to avoid Manchester United and Manchester City from playing home on the same night or on consecutive nights.

Group stage

Knockout phase

Round of 16

Quarter-finals

Semi-finals

Statistics

Squad appearances and goals
Last updated on 19 May 2019.

|-
! colspan="14" style="background:#dcdcdc; text-align:center"|Goalkeepers

|-
! colspan="14" style="background:#dcdcdc; text-align:center"|Defenders

|-
! colspan="14" style="background:#dcdcdc; text-align:center"|Midfielders

|-
! colspan="14" style="background:#dcdcdc; text-align:center"|Forwards

|-
! colspan=14 style=background:#dcdcdc; text-align:center|Players who have made an appearance this season but have left the club

|}

Squad statistics
{|class="wikitable" style="text-align:center"
|-
!
!style="width:70px"|League
!style="width:70px"|Europe
!style="width:70px"|Cup
!style="width:70px"|Others
!style="width:70px"|Total
|-
|align="left"|Games played       || 38 || 12 || 9 || 1 || 60
|-
|align="left"|Games won          || 26 || 8 || 5 || 1 || 40
|-
|align="left"|Games drawn        || 9 || 3 || 1 || 0 || 13
|-
|align="left"|Games lost         || 3 || 1 || 3 || 0 || 7
|-
|align="left"|Goals scored       || 90 || 26 || 20 || 2 || 138
|-
|align="left"|Goals conceded     || 36 || 10 || 9 || 1 || 56
|-
|align="left"|Goal difference    || 54|| 16 || 11 || 1 || 82
|-
|align="left"|Clean sheets       || 17 || 6 || 3 || 0 || 26
|-
|align="left"|Goal by Substitute || 8 || 2 || 1 || 0 || 11
|-
|align="left"|Total shots        || – || – || – || – || –
|-
|align="left"|Shots on target    || – || – || – || – || –
|-
|align="left"|Corners            || – || – || – || – || –
|-
|align="left"|Players used       || – || – || – || – || –
|-
|align="left"|Offsides           || – || – || – || – || –
|-
|align="left"|Fouls suffered     || – || – || – || – || –
|-
|align="left"|Fouls committed    || – || – || – || – || –
|-
|align="left"|Yellow cards       || 70 || 19 || 18 || 3 || 110
|-
|align="left"|Red cards          || 2 || 1 || 0 || 0 || 3
|-

Goalscorers

As of match played 25 May 2019.

Hat-tricks

(H) – Home; (A) – Away

Clean sheets

As of match played 7 April 2019.

Disciplinary record

Injury record

References

External links

FC Barcelona seasons
Barcelona
Barcelona
Spanish football championship-winning seasons
2018–19 in Catalan football